Levan Mikadze or Levan Miqadze (born 13 September 1973 in Sukhumi) is a retired Georgian footballer.
Mikadze played his only cap on 26 April 2000.

He changed his playing name to Lavrenti Mikadze (his brother's name) and his birth date to 20 November 1978 (his brother's birthday) later in his career, after starting to play under his real name of Levan.

Mikadze signed for Russian Premier League side FC Anzhi Makhachkala in February 2000, but left the club before the start of the season.

References

External links
 
 
 
 

1973 births
Living people
Sportspeople from Sukhumi
Footballers from Abkhazia
Footballers from Georgia (country)
Georgia (country) international footballers
Expatriate footballers from Georgia (country)
Expatriate footballers in Poland
Expatriate footballers in Ukraine
Expatriate sportspeople from Georgia (country) in Ukraine
Expatriate footballers in Belarus
Expatriate footballers in Latvia
Expatriate footballers in Russia
Expatriate sportspeople from Georgia (country) in Poland
Expatriate sportspeople from Georgia (country) in Latvia
Ekstraklasa players
Ukrainian Premier League players
FC Metalurgi Rustavi players
FC Zugdidi players
Pogoń Szczecin players
FC Dinamo Tbilisi players
FC Lokomotivi Tbilisi players
FC CSKA Kyiv players
FC Arsenal Kyiv players
FC Kryvbas Kryvyi Rih players
FC Partizan Minsk players
FK Liepājas Metalurgs players
FC Baltika Kaliningrad players
Association football defenders
Expatriate sportspeople from Georgia (country) in Belarus
Expatriate sportspeople from Georgia (country) in Russia
Erovnuli Liga players